Riau Main Stadium is a multi-purpose stadium in Pekanbaru, Riau, Indonesia.  Completed in 2012, it will be used mostly for football matches and hosted the opening and closing ceremonies for the 2012 Pekan Olahraga Nasional.  The stadium has a capacity of 43,923. In July 2012, this stadium hosted AFC U-22 Asian Cup qualification rounds.

See also
 List of stadiums in Indonesia
 List of stadiums by capacity

References

Sports venues in Indonesia
Football venues in Indonesia
Athletics (track and field) venues in Indonesia
Multi-purpose stadiums in Indonesia
Sports venues in Riau
Football venues in Riau
Athletics (track and field) venues in Riau
Sports venues in Pekanbaru
Football venues in Pekanbaru
Athletics (track and field) venues in Pekanbaru
Pekanbaru
Buildings and structures in Riau
Buildings and structures in Pekanbaru
Sports venues completed in 2012